Carodista tribrachia is a moth in the family Lecithoceridae. It is found in Sri Lanka.

The wingspan is 21–22 mm. The forewing pattern is similar to Carodista grypotatos, but the costal yellowish patch is weakly represented and smaller and the postmedian line is more distinct. The hindwings are grey.

Etymology
The species name refers to the three lobes of the juxta in the male genitalia and is derived from tri (meaning three) and brachi (meaning arm).

References

Moths described in 2001
Carodista
Moths of Sri Lanka